Robert Meacham (1835–1902) was an African-American leader in Florida during Reconstruction. He was born with slave status in Quincy, Florida; as one of the sons of his enslaver, he was educated by him. He purchased his freedom and that of his mother with money he had saved out of gratuities given to him by his enslaver. He helped to establish the African Methodist Episcopal Church in Florida and acted as a minister. He helped write Florida's new Constitution of 1868.

In 1868 he was appointed clerk of the Circuit Court for Jefferson County, Florida. The following year he was named "superintendent of common schools". After a two-year term he became postmaster of Monticello, Florida, county seat of Jefferson County. In 1871 he was reappointed to the school position, renewed again when the two-year term ran out. He went on to win a seat in the Florida state legislature as a state senator serving from 1868 until 1879. 
In 1880 he was made postmaster of Punta Gorda, Florida. He retired to Tampa in 1896, due to failing health, and died in 1902.

See also
William D. Bloxham
African-American officeholders during and following the Reconstruction era

References

People of the Reconstruction Era
Republican Party Florida state senators
African-American state legislators in Florida
African Methodist Episcopal Church clergy
1835 births
1902 deaths
People from Gadsden County, Florida
African-American politicians during the Reconstruction Era
Florida postmasters
Free Negroes
People from Jefferson County, Florida
People from Charlotte County, Florida
School superintendents in Florida
19th-century American clergy